Sarawak issued revenue stamps from 1875 to 1942 when it was an independent kingdom as well as when it was under Japanese occupation.

History
The Brooke government first issued postage rules on 1 March 1869, after the death of James Brooke. The first stamp in Sarawak bears the portrait of James Brooke with a facial value of three cents. The stamps were not only for local postage inland, but also had franking rights for postage to Singapore, where another stamp from the straits settlement will be added to carry the postage to their destinations. The stamp was also designated for tax collection.

Another stamp was issued in 1875. A 3c black inscribed Sarawak Receipt Stamp portraying Sir Charles Brooke was issued, and ten years later in 1885 this was reprinted in red. The first issue in black is scarcer than the red stamp, but neither of them is particularly rare.

Around 1887, various postage stamps were overprinted with a large R to specify fiscal use only. Some were also additionally overprinted REVENUE ONLY. apart from the initial overprint to confirm this. All overprinted issues were withdrawn on 30 June 1900, the day before a new vertical design was issued, again portraying Sir Charles Brooke. These remained in use until the Rajah's death, and in 1918 this set was reissued with the portrait of the new monarch, his son Sir Charles Vyner Brooke. Some of these were also overprinted with provisional surcharges in 1934. The 1900 and 1918 sets also exist overprinted CUSTOMS diagonally.

Japanese forces overran Sarawak in February 1942. Initially, revenues from the 1918 issues were handstamped in Japanese, but these were quickly replaced with postage stamps overprinted in various Japanese characters. These were used until Sarawak was liberated by Australian forces in 1945. After the war, postage stamps were used for fiscal purposes. Sarawak joined the Federation of Malaya and North Borneo to form Malaysia in 1963. Since then Malaysian revenue stamps have been used in Sarawak.

See also 
 Revenue stamps of Malaysia

References 

Sarawak
Taxation in Malaysia
Raj of Sarawak